Cathy's Child is a 1979 Australian film, directed by Donald Crombie and starring Michele Fawdon, Alan Cassell and Bryan Brown.

Plot
Cathy Baikas (Fawdon) is a woman of Greek heritage who lives in Sydney, Australia with her three-year-old daughter. When her daughter's father kidnaps the child and takes her back to Greece, Cathy discovers the authorities can do little to help her. She turns to the media. A reporter on the Hotline column of The Sun, a major daily newspaper, (Cassell) proves sympathetic to Cathy's problem and begins giving her case press coverage, because the same situation had happened to him. The film is based on a true story.

Historical basis
On 14 January 1973 Greek born John Baikas left Australia for Athens, taking his daughter Maris with him on a forged passport. Her mother Cathy found out and tried to get her back. The government seemed to do little so she contacted Sun journalist Dick Wordley to run a campaign.

The film used the real names for the characters of Cathy Baikas, Dick Wordley and Wordley's Hotline editor Paul Nicholson. However other names were fictionalised.

Production
Ken Quinnell read Dick Wordley's 1973 book on the case, A Piece of Paper. He gave it to producer Errol Sullivan who thought it might make "a small but highly emotional film, one that could reach the middle audience in Australia - the audience that people like Hoyts say doesn't exist: namely, the North Shore, blue rinse set."

It was thought the budget had to be kept below $400,000 so the action was set in the present day rather than 1973.  Finance from the Australian Film Commission, the New South Wales Film Corporation, Roadshow Distributors and $55,000 of private investment. Gillian Armstrong was originally meant to be director and money was raised from the AFC on the basis of her name, but there was a potential clash with My Brilliant Career so Donald Crombie was offered the job instead; Crombie had a history of making films about women.

Filming started in June 1978, with the majority of the film shot in Sydney over four weeks, with a week's filming in Greece. Money had been allocated in the budget for an overseas actor to play the Australian consul in Greece but the filmmakers were unable to find any one for an appropriate price and Willie Fennell took the role.

The script included a scene where Cathy and Dick Wordley go to bed together. Wordley denied this ever happened but allowed it in the film after much discussion. The scene was shot but ended up being cut after a preview.

Reception

Awards
Michele Fawdon was awarded Best Actress in a Leading Role at the 1979 Australian Film Institute Awards for her role as Cathy Baikis.

The film also received nominations for Best Actor in a Lead Role, Best Direction and Best Film at the same awards.

Box office
Cathy's Child grossed $135,000 at the box office in Australia, which is equivalent to $527,850
in 2009 dollars.

In 1996 Donald Crombie said the film was his favourite of all the features he had made:
Mainly because I think we were extraordinarily successful in creating that character, Cathy Bikos. Michelle Fawdon is obviously not Maltese, but she pulled that off brilliantly, I thought. The accent, I'm told, is perfect. She lived with a family and that's how she achieved it. That was a very good project to work on.

See also
Cinema of Australia

References

External links

Cathy's Child at Oz Movies

Cathy's Child at the National Film and Sound Archive

1979 films
Australian drama films
Films directed by Donald Crombie
Drama films based on actual events
1970s English-language films